Mordellistena amplicollis is a species of beetle in the family Mordellidae. It is in the genus Mordellistena. It was discovered in 1941.

References

amplicollis
Beetles described in 1941